Baazi (lit. Gamble) is a 1995 Indian action thriller film directed by Ashutosh Gowarikar and starring Aamir Khan and Mamta Kulkarni.

Plot
The story opens with a group of people travelling in a bus. The bus is stopped on its way and a bunch of hooligans board the bus and create a nuisance when a man tricks them into getting off the bus. Later, the bus stops for a tea break and the hooligans arrive at the same time, when suddenly a passing convoy is attacked and the assassins try to kill the man inside one of the cars. The man, using his swiftness, foils the attack and manages to nab and arrest one of the attackers while killing a few others. Two of the gang manage to escape the hotel.

This man is Inspector Amar Damjee Rathod (Aamir Khan) and the person in the car turns out to be Chief Minister Vishwasrao Chowdhury (Raza Murad), who was impressed with Amar and delegates to him the task of locating the people behind a multi-crore rupee international scandal to Amar. Amar promises to fulfill the job to the best of his ability.

It is shown that Chaubey (an assistant to the CM) was the one who committed the fraud and is trying to ensure that he is not caught, and hence he had asked the assassins to attack the CM. Amar tries to break the back of crime and this starts irritating Chaubey, who senses how close Amar is getting.  Chaubey then frames Amar for the murder of the daughter of the Police Commissioner Mazumdar (Kulbhushan Kharbanda).

Amar, after a long fight with the head assassin Raghu, escapes prison along with several others.  He then plots a scheme to go undercover as a woman to find the man behind all of this.  He finds Chaubey and recognizes him as the man who killed both his parents.  Eventually, Chaubey's assassins take everyone hostage in a 12-story tower in attempt to attack the CM once again, but Amar slowly but surely gets rid them all.  As Chaubey tries to escape the scene via a helicopter on the terrace, Amar prevents him and eventually knocks him into a satellite dish, electrocuting Chaubey to death.  Amar is congratulated by the CM and the Police Commissioner.

Cast
 Aamir Khan – Inspector Amar Damjee Rathore and also Sanjana's love interest.
 Mamta Kulkarni – Sanjana Roy, Journalist and Amar's love interest.
 Paresh Rawal – Deputy CM Chaturvedi alias Chaubey
 Ashish Vidyarthi - Shiva 
 Avtar Gill – Sub Inspector Deshpande 
 Kulbhushan Kharbanda – Commissioner Mazumdar
 Haidar Ali as Inspector Damjee Kunwar Singh Rathore, Amar's father
 Aparajita as Shanti Rathore, Amar's mother
 Raza Murad – Chief Minister Vishwasrao Chowdhury
 Satish Shah – Editor Roy
 Mukesh Rishi – Raghu
 Jaya Mathur – Anjali
 Asrani – Hiranandani

Soundtrack
The music of the film was composed by Anu Malik. The lyrics were written by Majrooh Sultanpuri and Anwar Sagar.

Reception

Box office
The film grossed 88.05 million at box office.

Reviews
It received mixed reviews from critics, with an India Today reviewer at its release calling it "an ambitious collage of foreign films - Die Hard, Point Break, Rambo - that just doesn't work." Film director Satyajit Bhatkal, after calling it a "Die Hard remake", stated that "the masala created massive indigestion both critically and commercially."

References

External links
 

1995 films
1995 action films
Indian action thriller films
Indian crime thriller films
1990s Hindi-language films
Films scored by Anu Malik
Films directed by Ashutosh Gowariker
Hindi-language action films